UNISURF was a pioneering surface CAD/CAM system, designed to assist with car body design and tooling. It was developed by French engineer Pierre Bézier for Renault in 1968, and entered full use at the company in 1975. By 1999, around 1,500 Renault employees made use of UNISURF for car design and manufacture.

References

External links

Computer-aided design software
Renault